Shirley Gold (October 2, 1925 – February 27, 1998) was an American politician who served in the Oregon House of Representatives from 1981 to 1989. She did not run for re-election in 1988, but instead ran for the Oregon State Senate, where she would serve from 1989 to 1997. She was succeeded in the House by fellow Democrat Bev Stein.

In 1995, Gold was described as a "longtime advocate of child care" as the chair of the Senate Revenue Committee that sponsored two bills that intended to improve childcare workers' pay.

She did not run for re-election to the Senate in 1996, and was succeeded by fellow Democrat Kate Brown, who would later become Secretary of State and then Governor of Oregon.

Gold died of pancreatic cancer on February 27, 1998, in Portland, Oregon at age 72.

References

1925 births
1998 deaths
Democratic Party members of the Oregon House of Representatives
Democratic Party Oregon state senators
Politicians from Portland, Oregon
20th-century American politicians